Daniel Francois Roodt (born 26 May 1957) is an Afrikaner author, publisher, and commentator.

Early life and education
Roodt was born in the mining town of Springs, east of Johannesburg, South Africa. He completed his schooling in Johannesburg, after which he enrolled for a Bachelor's degree at the University of Witwatersrand.

Career
Roodt lectured at the University of Durban-Westville for a while, and in 1985 left South Africa for France to avoid conscription in the South African Defence Force.

Times LIVE said that in the 1980s, Roodt was an anti-establishment anarchist, but that now "he is branded a right-wing reactionary" for his "vehement anti-ANC essays". Two of his literary works had been banned by the South African government in 1980, a time of strict censorship.

After returning to South Africa in 1992, Roodt worked for Citibank until 1999, and in 2000 he co-founded PRAAG (Pro-Afrikaanse Aksiegroep, or Pro-Afrikaans Action Group), which describes itself as an extra-parliamentary movement devoted to the rights of Afrikaners. PRAAG also has a publishing division, which has published some of his recent works. Roodt has contributed articles to Focus, the journal of the liberal Helen Suzman Foundation, columns to American Renaissance, a white nationalist magazine, various scientific or academic journals in South Africa as well as a host of articles in South African newspapers. He has also appeared on television and radio talk shows in South Africa.

In May 2011 Roodt stood for the Freedom Front Plus during the municipal elections as a candidate in Johannesburg, but was not elected.

Roodt is the deputy leader and spokesperson of South African right-wing political party Front Nasionaal formed in late 2013 which promotes separatism and Afrikaner self-determination. The Sunday newspaper Rapport reported on 8 February 2015 that Roodt had been "voted out of the party" without him being aware of it. He was quoted in the article as saying that "he would henceforth be devoting his energy to his publishing company, Praag... I am disillusioned with Afrikaner politics. I am finished with Afrikaner politics."

Activism
Roodt has strong views on the preservation of Afrikaans and Afrikaner culture, which has led to some controversy in the South African media. He maintains a blog and the PRAAG website, commenting on issues in South Africa. Roodt also regularly writes letters regarding political matters to various South African newspapers and the literary e-zine LitNet.

Controversy
 
Roodt caused a controversy after creating an internet site about South African journalist, writer and activist Max du Preez. Roodt explained that he had set up the site 'so that everyone who has always wanted to say something about "this idiot and prat", but did not have the means, now has the opportunity'. When contacted by Afrikaans Sunday newspaper Rapport for comment, Du Preez replied that 'it only confirms what I suspected: That Dan has a homo-erotic fixation with me'. In May 2011, the domain name in question was seized by the regulator of South African web domain names, and given to Du Preez. A judge ruled that Roodt had misused Du Preez's name as part of a slanderous campaign against the latter. The website has since been offline.

In March 2010 Roodt advised Afrikaners to support the football team of the Netherlands instead of the South African team in the FIFA World Cup, hosted by South Africa in June and July 2010.

In May 2010 Roodt travelled to Europe where he met with members of the Swedish Resistant Movement (Swedish: Svenska Motståndsrörelsen) a Scandinavian group which describes itself as a National Socialist organisation.

Roodt was the subject of a report for The Daily Show entitled The Amazing Racists by comedian John Oliver in June 2010 in which Roodt made a number of prejudiced statements about black South Africans. This led Oliver to satirically declare Roodt's views as representing "some of the finest examples of vintage bigotry". Roodt stated that producers of the show had edited the interview to portray him in a negative light and threatened to sue the show.  The South African Afrikaans civil rights organisation AfriForum publicly criticised Roodts statements as racist.

In 2012, the Press Ombudsman ordered the weekly tabloid Sondag to publish a front-page apology to Roodt for publishing a defamatory article about him.

Writing
Roodt's first novel, Sonneskyn en Chevrolet (Taurus, 1980), is an anti-establishment commentary on South African society (and specifically Afrikaner society) of that time. His only published volume of poetry to date, Kommas uit 'n boomzol (Uitgewery Pannevis, 1980), structurally parodies Komas uit 'n bamboesstok (Human & Rousseau, 1979), a volume of poetry by the Afrikaans poet D.J. Opperman. Afrikaans literary critic John Kannemeyer asserts that there is 'no one poem of any intrinsic value' in Kommas uit 'n boomzol, and similarly views Roodt's subsequent prose work Twee sinne (Taurus, 1985).

Roodt's first publication after Twee sinne is a critical essay on the South African Truth and Reconciliation Commission (TRC) entitled Om die Waarheidskommissie te vergeet ('Forgetting the Truth Commission', 2001). This would be PRAAG's first publication of one of Roodt's works. In 2004, PRAAG published the novel Moltrein, which is about a promising musician who leaves South Africa during the 1980s to avoid military service in the South African Defence Force.

In 2005 Roodt released The Scourge of the ANC (PRAAG), a critique of the ANC, and also of the former South African government under leadership of FW de Klerk. The following year, Aweregs (PRAAG, 2006), another collection of political essays, was released. Regarding Aweregs, Venter notes that if the ultimate aim of the book is

to demonstrate the author's pessimism regarding Africa, the African National Congress (ANC), "the new" South Africa, and supporters of the idea that Afrikaans can only survive by developing multilingualism in South Africa, then Roodt's vision succeeds. But it is a limited and distressing vision.

In 2015, Roodt published an essay Raiders of the Lost Empire: South Africa's English Identity (PRAAG) in which he "explores the country's 'new' English identity which is founded on the old colonial identity of the nineteenth century when the redcoats invaded the Cape of Good Hope."

Personal life
Roodt currently lives with his wife, Karin (née Bredenkamp), and their three children in Johannesburg, South Africa.

References

External links

 Homepage of the Pro-Afrikaans Action Group 

1957 births
Living people
Afrikaner people
People from Springs, Gauteng
South African people of Dutch descent
Afrikaans-language writers
Afrikaner nationalists
South African white nationalists
South African male novelists